Big Bad Voodoo Daddy is the self-titled debut album by contemporary swing band Big Bad Voodoo Daddy released on the bands-own record label Big Bad Records. The band re-recorded the songs "Jumpin' Jack" and "King of Swing" for their following full-length album Americana Deluxe. Also, "So Long, Good Bye" appears on Americana Deluxe in a re-recorded version having the title slightly modified to "So Long, Farewell, Goodbye". "Machine Gun" was re-recorded for their third full-length album This Beautiful Life and appears under the title "2000 Volts" with modified lyrics. "13 Women" is a cover version of the song originally performed by Bill Haley & His Comets. "Fire" is originally performed by Louis Jordan.

Track listing

Personnel
Scotty Morris – vocals, guitar
Dirk Shumaker – Bass, vocals
Andy Rowley – baritone, tenor saxophone, vocals
Ralph Votrian – trumpet, vocals
Kurt Sodergren – Drums, percussion

Additional Musicians
Stan Middleton – trombone
Bob Ayer – clarinet

Charts

Weekly charts

Year-end charts

References

1994 debut albums
Big Bad Voodoo Daddy albums